The 2019 San Francisco District Attorney election was held on November 5, 2019, to elect the next District Attorney of San Francisco. The election, which was held alongside the 2019 mayoral election in which incumbent mayor London Breed won her first full term, was won by public defender Chesa Boudin.

The incumbent district attorney, George Gascón, announced in October 2018 that he would not seek a third term. Gascón then abruptly resigned in October 2019, and Breed appointed Suzy Loftus to replace him on an interim basis.

Four candidates, Chesa Boudin, Suzy Loftus, Nancy Tung, and Leif Dautch, ran in the nonpartisan election, with Boudin and Loftus seen as the front-runners. San Francisco elections are conducted using ranked-choice voting: voters are permitted to rank the candidates in order of preference, and should no candidate garner a majority of first-choice votes, the support of the candidates with the fewest votes are successively re-allocated until one candidate attains a majority.

The winner of the election was unclear for several days; Loftus conceded the race to Boudin on November 9. The final results showed Boudin defeating Loftus by 4.6 percentage points in first-choice votes, and by 1.7 percentage points in the final round.

Background 

In January 2011, district attorney Kamala Harris resigned to become attorney general of California, having been elected in 2010. George Gascón, at the time the chief of police of San Francisco, was appointed as her successor by outgoing Mayor Gavin Newsom, who had been elected in 2010 to become lieutenant governor of California. Gascón was subsequently elected to two full terms as district attorney, in 2011 and in 2015.

On October 2, 2018, after Suzy Loftus announced her candidacy for the office, Gascón announced that he would not seek re-election. On October 19, 2019, in the midst of the campaign, Gascón abruptly resigned as district attorney; he said he was considering running for district attorney of Los Angeles in 2020. Mayor London Breed then appointed Loftus to replace Gascón. The appointment was criticized by Loftus's election opponents, who charged that Breed was conferring the advantage of incumbency on her preferred candidate less than three weeks before the election; until the appointment of Loftus, the election had been slated to be the first open race for district attorney in over a century. However, some contend that the appointment hurt Loftus's chances in the election, as voters felt that the decision had seemingly been taken away from them.

Candidates 

Chesa Boudin, public defender
Leif Dautch, prosecutor, former deputy district attorney of San Francisco
Suzy Loftus, interim district attorney of San Francisco,  former police commissioner of San Francisco
Nancy Tung, prosecutor, deputy district attorney of Alameda County, former deputy attorney general of California

Endorsements

Polling

Results 
The results of the election are shown in the following tables:

Aftermath 

Loftus conceded to Boudin on November 9. Since Boudin was seen as by far the most progressive candidate in the race, the result was interpreted as a continuation of a national trend of bold criminal justice reformists elected in large cities, including Larry Krasner in Philadelphia; Rachael Rollins in Boston; and Kim Foxx in Chicago.

Boudin took office on January 8, 2020.

References

External links 

Chesa Boudin campaign website
Leif Dautch campaign website
Suzy Loftus campaign website
Nancy Tung campaign website

San Francisco District Attorney
Election District Attorney
District Attorney 2019
San Francisco District Attorney